Ian Collard (born 31 August 1947) is an English former professional footballer. During his career he made 69 appearances for West Bromwich Albion, winning the FA Cup in 1968, before moving to Ipswich Town in 1969 where he made 92 league appearances under the management of Bobby Robson. He had a loan spell at Portsmouth near the end of his time at Portman Road, before leaving the club in 1976 and calling time on his professional career at the age of 29.

External links 
Ian Collard at Pride of Anglia

Living people
1947 births
Association football midfielders
West Bromwich Albion F.C. players
Ipswich Town F.C. players
People from Hetton-le-Hole
Footballers from Tyne and Wear
English footballers
FA Cup Final players